Gholam Reza Pourmand is a notable Iranian urologist and medical scientist.

He is currently a full professor of urology and director of the "Renal Transplantation Research Center" of the Tehran University of Medical Sciences. 

Prof. Pourmand has published numerous research articles in urology in peer-reviewed international journals. His novel prostate surgery method attracted attention from the international medical community.

See also 
Iranian science

External links 
Pourmand's publications in PubMed

Academic staff of Tehran University of Medical Sciences
Iranian urologists
Year of birth missing (living people)
Living people